The zlib license is a permissive free software license which defines the terms under which the zlib software library can be distributed. It is also used by many other free software packages. The libpng library uses a similar license sometimes referred interchangeably as  zlib/libpng license.

The zlib license has been approved by the Free Software Foundation (FSF) as a free software license, and by the Open Source Initiative (OSI) as an open source license. It is compatible with the GNU General Public License.

Terms
The license only has the following points to be accounted for:
 Software is used on 'as-is' basis. Authors are not liable for any damages arising from its use.
 The distribution of a modified version of the software is subject to the following restrictions:
 The authorship of the original software must not be misrepresented,
 Altered source versions must not be misrepresented as being the original software, and
 The license notice must not be removed from source distributions.

The license does not require source code to be made available if distributing binary code.

Text
The license terms are as follows:

See also

 Comparison of free and open-source software licenses
 Software using the zlib license (category)

References

External links

 License text on the zlib homepage

Free and open-source software licenses
Permissive software licenses